Rolf Martin Zinkernagel (born 6 January 1944) is a professor of experimental immunology at the University of Zurich. Along with Peter C. Doherty, he shared the 1996 Nobel Prize in Physiology or Medicine for the discovery of how the immune system recognizes virus-infected cells.

Education
Zinkernagel received his MD degree from the University of Basel in 1970 and his PhD from the Australian National University in 1975.

Career and research
Zinkernagel is a member of the Cancer Research Institute Scientific Advisory Council, the American Academy of Arts and Sciences, The National Academy of Sciences, the American Philosophical Society, and The Academy of Cancer Immunology. Zinkernagel was elected as a Corresponding Fellow to the Australian Academy of Science also in 1996.

Awards and honours
Together with the Australian Peter C. Doherty he received the 1996 Nobel Prize in Physiology or Medicine for the discovery of how the immune system recognizes virus-infected cells.  With this he became the 24th Swiss Nobel laureate. In 1999 he was awarded an honorary Companion of the Order of Australia (AC), Australia's highest civilian honour, for his scientific work with Doherty.

Viruses infect host cells and reproduce inside them. Killer T-cells destroy those infected cells so that the viruses can't reproduce. Zinkernagel and Doherty discovered that, in order for killer T-cells to recognize infected cells, they had to recognize two molecules on the surface of the cell—not only the virus antigen, but also a molecule of the major histocompatibility complex (MHC). This recognition was done by a T-cell receptor on the surface of the T-cell. The MHC was previously identified as being responsible for the rejection of incompatible tissues during transplantation. Zinkernagel and Doherty discovered that the MHC was responsible for the body fighting meningitis viruses too.

In addition to the Nobel Prize, he also won the Cloëtta Prize in 1981, the Cancer Research Institute William B. Coley Award in 1987, the Otto-Naegeli-Preis in 1988 and the Albert Lasker Medical Research Award in 1995. In 1994 he became a member of the German Academy of Sciences Leopoldina. Zinkernagel was elected a Foreign Member of the Royal Society (ForMeRS) in 1998.

References

External links 
  including the Nobel Lecture  December 1996 Cellular Immune Recognition and the Biological Role of Major Transplantation Antigens

1944 births
Living people
Nobel laureates in Physiology or Medicine
Swiss Nobel laureates
Scientists from Basel-Stadt
Members of the European Molecular Biology Organization
Foreign associates of the National Academy of Sciences
Foreign Members of the Royal Society
Foreign Members of the Russian Academy of Sciences
Swiss immunologists
Australian National University alumni
Academic staff of the University of Zurich
Recipients of the Pour le Mérite (civil class)
Honorary Companions of the Order of Australia
People from Riehen
Recipients of the Albert Lasker Award for Basic Medical Research
Fellows of the Australian Academy of Science
Members of the German Academy of Sciences Leopoldina
Members of the American Philosophical Society